A telephone booth, telephone kiosk, telephone call box, telephone box or public call box is a tiny structure furnished with a payphone and designed for a telephone user's convenience; usually the user steps into the booth and closes the booth door while using the payphone inside.

In the United States and Canada, "telephone booth" (or "phone booth") is the commonly used term for the structure, while in the Commonwealth of Nations (particularly the United Kingdom and Australia), it is a "phone box".

Such a booth usually has lighting, a door to provide privacy, and windows to let others know if the booth is in use. The booth may be furnished with a printed directory of local telephone numbers, and a booth in a formal setting, such as a hotel, may be furnished with paper and pen and even a seat. An outdoor booth may be made of metal and plastic to withstand the elements and heavy use, while an indoor booth (once known as a silence cabinet) may have more elaborate architecture and furnishings. Most outdoor booths feature the name and logo of the telephone service provider.

History

The world's first telephone box called "Fernsprechkiosk", was opened on 12 January 1881 at Potsdamer Platz, Berlin. To use it, one had to buy paper tickets called Telefonbillet which allowed for a few minutes of talking time. In 1899, it was replaced by a coin-operated telephone.

William Gray is credited with inventing the coin payphone in the United States in 1889, and George A. Long was its developer. The first telephone booth in London, England, was probably installed near the Staple Inn in High Holborn in May 1903.

In the UK, the creation of a national network of telephone boxes commenced in 1920 starting with the K1 which was made of concrete, however the city of Kingston upon Hull is noted for having its individual phone service, Kingston Communications, with cream coloured phone boxes, as opposed to classic royal red in the rest of Britain. Also,  The Post Office was forced into allowing a less strident grey with red glazing bars scheme for areas of natural and architectural beauty. Ironically, some of these areas that have preserved their telephone boxes have now painted them red.

Design
Starting in the 1970s, pay telephones were less and less commonly placed in booths in the United States. In many cities where they were once common, telephone booths have now been almost completely replaced by non-enclosed pay phones. In the United States, this replacement was caused, at least in part, by an attempt to make the pay telephones more accessible to disabled people. However, in the United Kingdom, telephones remained in booths more often than the non-enclosed setup. Although still fairly common, the number of phone boxes has declined sharply in Britain since the late 1990s due to the boom of mobile phones.

Many locations that provide pay-phones mount the phones on kiosks rather than in booths—this relative lack of privacy and comfort discourages lengthy calls in high-demand areas such as airports.

Special equipment installed in some telephone booths allows a caller to use a computer, a portable fax machine, or a telecommunications device for the deaf.

Privacy 
Phone booths have been subject to wireless surveillance by law enforcement. For example, the landmark U.S. Supreme Court case of Katz v. United States involved the Constitutional question of whether the Federal Bureau of Investigation (FBI) could install a listening device outside of the booth.

Paying for the call

Coins
The user of the booth pays for the call by depositing coins into a slot on the telephone.  With some telephones the deposit is made before making the call, and the coins are returned if the call attempt is unsuccessful (busy, no answer, etc.).  With other types of telephone coins are not deposited until the call has been made and the caller hears their party answer.  The deposit of coins then permits two-way conversation to proceed.

Cards
Calls may be paid for by entering a payment code on the telephone's keypad, by swipe-card ("Swipe & Call") or by using a telephone card. Some pay phones are equipped with a card reader that allows a caller to make payment with a credit card.

Collect call
A caller who possesses no means of payment may have the phone company's operator ask the call recipient if the recipient is willing to make payment for the call; this is known as "reversing the charges", "reverse charged call" or a "collect call". It is also sometimes possible to place a call to a phone booth if the intended recipient is known to be waiting at the booth, but not all phone booths allow such incoming calls. Long before "computer hacking" was a common phenomenon, creative mischief-makers devised tactics for obtaining free phone usage through a variety of techniques, including several for defeating the electro-mechanical payment mechanisms of telephone booths—early methods of phone phreaking.

Emergency calls
Some jurisdictions require phone booths to provide dial-tone first services, allowing coinless access to the emergency telephone number and the switchboard operator, and do not require any coins or credit card payments for dialing such calls (Verizon New York Inc. v. Environmental Control Board of the City of New York, New York State Appellate Division First Department December 29, 2009).

Recent developments

Wireless services
The increasing use of mobile phones has led to a decreased demand for pay telephones, but the increasing use of laptops is leading to a new kind of service. In 2003, service provider Verizon announced that they would begin offering wireless computer connectivity in the vicinity of their phone booths in Manhattan. As of 2006, the Verizon wifi telephone booth service was discontinued in favor of the more expensive Verizon Wireless' EVDO system.

This allows a computer user to connect with remote computer services by means of a short-range device stationed within the booth. The caller pays for usage by means of a pre-arranged account code stored inside the caller's computer. Wireless access is motivating telephone companies to place wireless stations at locations that have traditionally hosted telephone booths, but stations are also appearing in new kinds of locations such as libraries, cafés, and trains. Phone booths have been slowly disappearing since the advent of the mobile phone in 1973.

Vandalism
A rise in vandalism has prompted several companies to manufacture simpler booths with extremely durable pay phones.

Dual currencies
Most telephone booths in Northern Ireland are able to accept two currencies: Pound sterling and Euro coins, due to the proximity to the Republic of Ireland. Similarly, mainly in large cities in Great Britain, certain telephone booths accept both sterling and euro. Other services provided by these booths are internet access, SMS text messaging and ordinary phone services.

Most telephone booths in the United States and Canada can accept both American and Canadian 5¢, 10¢, and 25¢ coins, due to their similar size and weight.

Withdrawal of services
Pay phones may still be used by mobile/cellular phone users if their phones become unusable, get stolen, or for other emergency uses. These uses may make the complete disappearance of pay phones in the near future less likely.

Australia
Under the Universal Service Obligation (USO), the Government legally requires telco Telstra to ensure standard phone services and payphones are “reasonably accessible to all people in Australia".  Some communities, particularly in remote regional areas, rely on payphones, as well as people who do not have access to a mobile phone.

At their peak in the early 1990s, there were more than 80,000 public phone boxes across the country.  By June 30, 2016, according to the ACMA there were about 24,000 payphones across Australia. On 3 August 2021, with 15,000 public phones remaining across Australia, Telstra announced that all calls to fixed line and mobile phones within Australia from public phones would become free of charge, and that Telstra had no plans to further eliminate public phones.

Belgium
In Belgium, majority state-owned telco Belgacom took the last remaining phone booths out of service on 1 June 2015.

Czechia
On 17 June 2021 the last phone booth in Czechia was closed and dismantled.

Denmark
On 13 December 2017 the last three public telephone booths in Denmark had their telephones removed. They were situated in the town of Aarhus.

Finland

By 2007, Finnet companies and TeliaSonera Finland had discontinued their public telephones, and the last remaining operator Elisa Oyj did that during the beginning of that year.

France
According to Orange CEO, Stéphane Richard, there are only 26 public phone booths still operating in France as of 2021. The "Macron law" of 2015 ended Orange mandatory maintenance of a public phone booth network, its decline in use being caused by the cell phones era. These are, by law, maintained in rural area where there is no cell phone service. Consequently they are removed once the area is properly covered by at least one mobile phone operator.

Ireland
Eir, the Universal Service Obligation carrier with regard to payphones, has been systematically removing payphones which fall under the minimum requirement for retention, of a rolling average of one minute of usage a day over six months 

As of June 2019, 456 locations retain payphones (with none in the entirety of County Leitrim); down from 1320 in March 2014.

Jordan
In 2004, Jordan became the first country in the world not to have telephone booths generally available. The mobile/cellular phone penetration in that country is so high that telephone booths have hardly been used at all for years. The two private payphone service companies, namely ALO and JPP, closed down, and currently there's no payphone service to speak of.

Norway
The last functioning phone box in Norway was taken out of service in June 2016. However, 100 of the phone boxes have been preserved around the country and are protected under cultural heritage laws.

Sweden
The first telephone booth in Sweden was erected in 1890. In 1981 there were 44,000 of them, but in 2013, there were only 1,200, with a withdrawal of the last one in 2015. A survey showed that in 2013, only 1% of the population in Sweden used one the previous year.

United Kingdom

The red telephone kiosk is recognised as a British icon and the BT Group still hold intellectual property rights in the designs of many of the telephone boxes, including registered trade mark rights. 
BT is steadily removing public telephone kiosks from the streets of the UK. It is permitted to remove a kiosk without consultation provided that there is another kiosk within  walking distance. In other cases, it is required to comply with Ofcom rules in consultation with the local authority. Some decommissioned red telephone boxes have been converted for other uses with the permission of BT Group, such as housing small community libraries or automated external defibrillators.

United States
In 1999, there were approximately 2 million phone booths in the United States. Only 5% of those remained in service by 2018. About a fifth of America's 100,000 remaining pay phones are in New York, according to the FCC. However, only 4 phone booths remain in New York City, all on Manhattan's Upper West Side; the rest have been converted into WiFi hotspots. Incoming calls are no longer available, and outgoing calls are now free. In February 2020, the city confirmed that despite a plan to remove dozens of pay phones, the iconic booths would continue to be maintained.

Smoking ban
Following the commencement of the smoking ban in England in 2007, it became illegal to smoke in red telephone boxes (types K2 to K8), due to these boxes being completely enclosed spaces. The smoking ban requires owners to display no smoking signs, which has resulted in BT displaying a "no smoking" sticker which refer to the telephone box as "premises". Despite smoking in red telephone boxes being banned, smoking in other telephone boxes remains legal as these boxes are not completely enclosed spaces.

Advertising
Many telephone boxes in the United Kingdom have become locations for advertisements, bearing posters, with the development of "StreetTalk" by JCDecaux. This is in addition to the ST6 public telephone introduced in 2007 which is  designed to feature a phone on one side and a JCDecaux-owned advertising space on the otherside. The advertising pays for the running of the phone.

In 2018, the UK Local Government Association drew attention to "Trojan" telephone boxes.  These are telephone boxes whose main purpose is advertising.  A loophole in planning law allows these to be erected without planning permission and the LGA is seeking to close this loophole.

Replacements for telephone booths
In the final third of the 20th century, pay telephone mounted on walls or kiosks became more common, often replacing older telephone booths.

In popular culture

In comic books published by DC Comics, the telephone booth is occasionally the place where reporter Clark Kent discards his street clothing and transforms into the costumed superhero Superman. Some films and television series featuring the character have also used, referenced, or spoofed this plot device.
The BBC science-fiction television series Doctor Who features the TARDIS, a time machine disguised as a Mackenzie Trench-style police box (a phone booth used by police).
La cabina is a disturbing 1972 Spanish short film about a man trapped in a phone booth. Nobody is able to free him, and the whole booth — with the man still inside — is carted away to a warehouse. 
The 1986 comedy film Clockwise features John Cleese's character vandalising a phone in a booth in frustration after it malfunctions. The scene played on the public perception in Britain at the time that telephone booths were frequently out of order.
Phone Booth is a 2002 thriller film where a man in a phone booth is targeted by a sniper. 
The Bill and Ted films from 1989 (Bill & Ted's Excellent Adventure), 1991 (Bill & Ted's Bogus Journey), and 2020 (Bill & Ted Face the Music) set in San Dimas, CA used a phone booth as a means of time travel and transport of historical figures.
In Harry Potter and the Order of the Phoenix, Harry and Mr. Weasley enter a London phone booth and dial 62442 (MAGIC). The booth is an elevator used as the visitor's entrance to the Ministry of Magic.
In the famous opening credits to the 1960s T.V. satire comedy Get Smart, Maxwell Smart (played by comedian Don Adams), a  Bond-like secret agent a.k.a. Agent 86, would go through a corridor, armed with steel doors which would close after his passage, to an American style phone booth in which he would enter, close its door, dial a special number on the rotary dial and, after hanging up, would get lowered into CONTROL's secret offices.

See also
Callbox
Hotspot (Wi-Fi)
Interactive kiosk
KX telephone boxes
Mojave phone booth
Payphone
Police box
Red telephone box
Giles Gilbert Scott, the English architect who designed the iconic red telephone box
Phonebooth stuffing

References

External links

 PayPhoneBox Index of payphone numbers and photographs of payphones in unusual or famous places around the world.

Public phones
Street furniture
Telephone services
Vending machines
1881 introductions